Emily in Paris is an American romantic comedy-drama television series created by Darren Star for Netflix. Set in Paris, the series stars Lily Collins as an aspiring marketing executive Emily Cooper, an American who moves to France to provide an American point of view to a French marketing firm. There, she struggles to succeed in the workplace while searching for love and experiencing a culture clash with her conventional Midwestern U.S. upbringing. She must learn to adapt and overcome the challenges that arise within her work, love life, and friendships. She learns to balance her work-life with her personal-life all while attempting to fit in with the Paris lifestyle. It also stars Philippine Leroy-Beaulieu, Ashley Park, Lucas Bravo, Samuel Arnold, Bruno Gouery, Camille Razat, William Abadie, and Lucien Laviscount.

Produced by MTV Entertainment Studios and originally developed for Paramount Network, where it was given a straight-to-series order in September 2018, the series moved to Netflix in July 2020. Filming takes place in Île-de-France, mainly in Paris and its suburbs, and began in August 2019.

Emily in Paris premiered on October 2, 2020, receiving positive reviews in the United States but was criticized in France, with many French critics condemning the show for negatively stereotyping Parisians and the French. In November 2020, the series was renewed for a second season by Netflix, which premiered on December 22, 2021. In January 2022, the series was renewed for a third and fourth season by Netflix. The third season premiered on December 21, 2022.

Premise
Emily in Paris follows Emily Cooper, an American college graduate in her late twenties with a Master's degree in communications who is from Chicago; she moves to Paris for an unexpected job opportunity. She is tasked with bringing an American point of view and social media presence to a venerable French marketing firm. Cultures clash as she adjusts to the challenges of life in Paris while juggling her career, new friendships, and active love life.

Cast and characters

Main

 Lily Collins as Emily Cooper, a 29-year-old who moves from Chicago to Paris for a temporary social media strategy job at Savoir.
 Philippine Leroy-Beaulieu as Sylvie, Emily's tough and bitter boss at Savoir in Paris
 Ashley Park as Mindy Chen, a Chinese Korean former nanny and aspiring singer who is Emily's first friend in Paris; Mindy is the heir of a Shanghai business magnate from whom she is currently estranged.
 Lucas Bravo as Gabriel, Emily's attractive downstairs neighbor who is the head chef at Chez Lavaux; he is also Emily's love interest and Camille's boyfriend, along with being an aspiring Michelin star chef.
 Samuel Arnold as Julien, Emily's co-worker; trendy and high-drama, he forms a funny duo with Luc.
 Bruno Gouery as Luc, Emily's quirky other co-worker, who forms a humorous duo with Julien.
 Camille Razat as Camille, Emily's new friend and Gabriel's girlfriend
 William Abadie as Antoine Lambert (season 2–present; recurring season 1), Emily's client who owns a perfume company called Maison Lavaux and is having a long-standing affair with Sylvie.
 Lucien Laviscount as Alfie (season 3; recurring season 2), an English banker in Emily's French class, who becomes Emily's love interest.

Recurring

 Kate Walsh as Madeline, Emily's boss in Chicago who cannot take the job in Paris after learning that she is pregnant.
 Jean-Christophe Bouvet as Pierre Cadault, a famous flamboyant French designer and uncle of Mathieu
 Charles Martins as Mathieu Cadault, a businessman who becomes Emily's love interest in the first season (seasons 1–2)
 Jeremy O. Harris as Grégory Elliot Duprée (season 2–present), Pierre Cadault's rival
 Céline Menville as Jacqueline (season 2–present; guest season 1), Emily's French teacher
 Kevin Dias as Benoît (season 2–present), Mindy's love interest and a member of her band
 Jin Xuan Mao as Étienne (season 2–present), a member of Mindy's band
  as Erik de Groot (season 2–present), a photographer and Sylvie's love interest
 Melia Kreiling as Sofia Sideris (season 3), an artist from Greece who works with Camille and with whom she is having an affair
 Paul Forman as Nicolas de Léon (season 3), a businessman and Mindy's love interest, with whom she attended a boarding school in Switzerland

Guest
  as Catherine Lambert, Antoine's wife
 Camille Japy as Louise, Camille's mother
 Christophe Guybet as Gerard, Camille's father
 Victor Meutelet as Timothée, Camille’s younger brother with whom Emily had a one-night stand
 Hanaé Cloarec-Bailly and Tytouan Cloarec-Bailly as Sybil and Laurent Dupont (season 1), the two children that Mindy nannies
 Arnaud Viard as Paul Brossard (season 1), the owner of Savoir
 Roe Hartrampf as Doug (seasons 1 and 3), Emily's ex-boyfriend in Chicago
 Claude Perron as Patricia (season 1), an employee at Savoir
 Eion Bailey as Randy Zimmer (season 1), a well-known hotel owner
 Aleksandra Yermak as Klara (season 1), representative of Hästens, a Swedish luxury bed maker
 Julien Floreancig as Thomas (season 1), a French snobbish philosophy professor
 Carlson Young as Brooklyn Clark (season 1), a young and famous American actress
 Elizabeth Tan as Li (season 1), Mindy's best friend who has brought her five bridesmaids to Paris to shop for her bride's dress
 David Prat as Théo (season 1), Camille's other brother
 Faith Prince as Judith Robertson (season 1), a member of the American Friends of the Louvre
 Isaiah Hodges and Christophe Tek as Grey Space (season 1), a duo of avant-garde designers
 Arnaud Binard as Laurent G. (season 2–present), Sylvie's husband
 Daria Panchenko as Petra (season 2), a woman in Emily's French class
 Ellen Von Unwerth as herself (season 2), a photographer hired for Pierre Cadault's photo shoot
 Julien Looman as Gerhard (season 2), Ellen Von Unwerth's agent and Julien's potential love interest
 Alice Révérend as Natalie (season 2), a bartender at Chez Lavaux
 Luca Ivoula as Raphael (season 2), a new sous chef at Gabriel's restaurant

Episodes

Series overview

Season 1 (2020)

Season 2 (2021)

Season 3 (2022)

Production

Development

On September 5, 2018, it was announced that Paramount Network had given the production a series order for a first season consisting of 10 episodes. The series was created by Darren Star, who has a multi-year overall deal with ViacomCBS and develops for ViacomCBS and for outsider buyers via MTV Entertainment Studios. Star was also expected to serve as an executive producer alongside Tony Hernandez. Production companies involved with the series were slated to consist of Jax Media. On July 13, 2020, it was reported that the series would move from Paramount Network to Netflix. On November 11, 2020, Netflix renewed the series for a second season. On January 10, 2022, Netflix renewed the series for a third and fourth season.

Casting
On April 3, 2019, Lily Collins was cast in the eponymous role. On August 13, 2019, Ashley Park had joined the main cast. On September 19, 2019, Philippine Leroy-Beaulieu, Lucas Bravo, Samuel Arnold, Camille Razat, and Bruno Gouery joined cast in starring roles, while Kate Walsh, William Abadie, and Arnaud Viard were cast in recurring roles. On May 24, 2021, Lucien Laviscount was cast in recurring role, while Abadie was promoted to series regular for the second season. On April 10, 2022, Laviscount was promoted to series regular for the third season.

Filming
Principal photography for the first season, in Paris and its suburbs, was expected to begin in early 2019, but began in August 2019.

Many scenes are filmed at Place de l'Estrapade in the 5th Arrondissement, including the site of Emily's first apartment, the restaurant ("Les Deux Compères"), and the bakery ("La Boulangerie Moderne") .  Some scenes are also filmed at Cité du Cinéma, a film studio complex in Saint-Denis. Famous Parisian sites to feature in the series include: Le Grand Véfour, the Pont Alexandre III, Palais Garnier, Jardin du Luxembourg, Jardin Du Palais Royale, Café de Flore and the Panthéon. An episode was also filmed at the Château de Sonnay in the department of Indre-et-Loire. Additional photography took place in Chicago during November 2019.

Filming for the second season began on May 3, 2021 and concluded on July 19, 2021. New filming locations for the second season include Monnaie de Paris, Musée des Arts Forains, Huatian Chinagora, Saint-Tropez, Palace of Versailles, Villefranche-sur-Mer, Grand-Hôtel du Cap-Ferrat, and other locations in France. Filming of the second season in Paris caused problems within the 5th Arrondissement, with the residents deeming the crew as brutal, threatening and too intrusive. Lily Collins stated that the second season was set in a COVID-19-free world, as the decision was made by the producers to ensure escapism through joy and laughter. In scenes that involved crowds, masks were off when they were on-camera, and back on once completed, which Collins stated was difficult to pull off. Filming for the third season began in June 2022.

Soundtrack
In October 2020, Ashley Park's "La Vie en rose", sung as a cappella by Mindy Chen in episode six, debuted at number one on Billboard's Top TV Songs chart. 's "Moon", sung in episode four, debuted at number four, and episode ten's Cavale's "Burst Into Flames" debuted at number seven. Alter K, a French music publisher and distributor, made significant contributions to the soundtrack, with half of the songs in the series being from its catalog. James Newton Howard composed the series' theme music and score.

Release
The series' first season was released by Netflix on October 2, 2020, followed by a DVD release on November 9, 2021. The second season was released on December 22, 2021. The third season had its premiere at the Théâtre des Champs-Élysées in Paris on December 6, 2022, and was released on December 21.

Reception

Audience viewership
For the week of October 5, 2020, Emily in Paris reached the top ten list of most watched streaming shows per Nielsen. On May 3, 2021, Netflix revealed that the series has been watched by 58 million households in the month after its debut. The series remained in UK top 10 list for 40 consecutive days after its release.

Critical response

For the first season, review aggregator Rotten Tomatoes reported an approval rating of 61% based on 57 reviews, with an average rating of 5.7/10. The website's critics consensus reads, "Though its depiction of France is tré cliché, Emily in Paris is rom-com fantasy at its finest, spectacularly dressed and filled with charming performances." Metacritic gave the first season a weighted average score of 58 out of 100 based on 18 reviews, indicating "mixed or average reviews".

The second season has a 61% approval rating on Rotten Tomatoes, based on 23 reviews, with an average rating of 5.2/10. The website's critics consensus states, "Emily in Paris remains a sugary soufflé, but it's liable to give a toothache to viewers who are seeking anything deeper than a frivolous romp." On Metacritic, the second season received a score of 64 based on reviews from 11 critics, indicating "generally favorable reviews".

For the third season, review aggregator Rotten Tomatoes reported an approval rating of 65% based on 17 reviews, with an average rating of 5.7/10.The website's critics consensus reads, "Emily in Paris' bubbly watchability keeps threatening to go flat in a third season that seems content to spin its wheels, but this gallic travelogue will still be a pleasant enough journey for fans." Metacritic gave the season a weighted average score of 54 out of 100 based on 10 reviews, indicating "mixed or average reviews".

Daniel D'Addario of Variety described the series as "a delight that poses the question of what it really means to grow up, against a truly inviting backdrop", and that Collins is "an inherently winsome performer who has never been quite as well used as she is here". Kristen Baldwin of Entertainment Weekly gave the series a "B" and wrote, "If you need a five-hour brain vacation, Paris is a worthwhile destination." The New Zealand Herald considered the show "visually delectable" and that "Collins has a pixie-ish charm which makes her endearing", but also that the show is "as ephemeral as fairy floss".  However, Kristen Lopez of IndieWire wrote a review Metacritic graded as a 23 out of a 100, praising Collins for being a "jewel, make no mistake" and that "Emily in Paris is only as watchable and frivolous as its leading lady," but warning viewers "Emily in Paris is like scrolling through Instagram. It's a great way to waste time looking at pretty pictures with no depth."

Nevertheless, not all critics were kind to the Emily character. Emma Gray from HuffPost called Emily a bland character, stating "The show doesn't even make an effort to quirk her up or give her a more relatable, girl-next-door roughness: she's always immaculately coiffed and made-up, and garbed in effortfully eye-catching outfits. But there's not much to the character, except for enormous amounts of self-confidence and the inexplicable ability to attract new friends and love interests on every street corner." Rebecca Nicholson of The Guardian gave the series one out of five stars: "if it is an attempt to fluff up the romcom for the streaming age, then it falls over on its six-inch heels." Rachel Handler opined "Darren Star has done it yet again: centered an entire show on a thin, gently delusional white woman whimsically exploring a major metropolitan area in wildly expensive couture purchased on a mid-level salary."

Sarah Moroz, of Vulture.com, opined "the most egregious oversight ... is Emily herself, who shows zero personal growth over a ten-episode arc. ... Emily's vapidity is baffling to anyone who has moved from their native country." Sonia Rao of The Washington Post compared Emily to the heroines of the Amy Sherman-Palladino universe: "Like the Gilmore girls, Emily is strong-willed and refuses to let anything get in the way of her schemes. Like Midge Maisel, her actions can be quite rash, but she still wins over her fictional acquaintances while utterly baffling viewers." Megan Garber of The Atlantic was critical of Emily, writing, "An expat who acts like a tourist, she judges everything against the backdrop of her own rigid Americanness. You might figure that those moments are evidence of a show poking fun at its protagonist's arrogance, or setting the stage for her to grow beyond her initial provincialism. But: You would be, as I was, mostly incorrect. Instead, other people change around her. They grudgingly concede that her way (strident, striving, teeming with insistent individualism) is the right way. The show—the latest from the Sex and the City creator Darren Star—is selling several fantasies. Primary among them is the notion that Emily can bulldoze her way through France and be celebrated for it."

Some critics appeared ambivalent, such as Jo Ellison writing for the Financial Times. On one hand she expresses admiration for the way Darren Star manages to depict "a version of womanhood in which promiscuity, bossiness and shopaholicism are depicted as qualities to be celebrated"; on the other "the major plot lines might have been written in the 1940s and the Frenchies are routinely cast as vain, preening and parochial." She concludes "Cliché-ridden and completely outdated: Darren Star's 'Sex and the Cité' will no doubt be monstrously successful."

Many French critics condemned the show for negatively stereotyping Parisians and the French. Charles Martin wrote in Première that the show unfairly stereotyped and depicted the French as "lazy [individuals who] never arrive at the office before the end of the morning [...] are flirtatious and not really attached to the concept of loyalty [...] are sexist and backward, and [...] have a questionable relationship with showering". A reviewer at Sens Critique wrote: "Emily in Paris projects the same twee, unrealistic image of Paris that the film Amélie does". RTL.fr wrote: "Rarely had we seen so many clichés on the French capital since the Parisian episodes of Gossip Girl or the end of The Devil Wears Prada."

Cultural influence 
The show's popularity has reportedly increased tourism in Paris, with hotels and restaurants benefiting from "the Emily effect". Tours of locations that appear on the show are available; an American living in Paris complained, The New York Times wrote, of "dozens of raucous 'Emily in Paris' pilgrims who now swarmed [Café de Flore]. taking Instagram-ready selfies".

Controversies

Depiction of Ukrainian character 
The second season was met with controversy in Ukraine over the depiction of a Ukrainian character named Petra (a name not used in Ukraine), who was depicted as a petty thief and shoplifter, with the hashtag "Мы не Петры" (We are not Petras) trending for a matter of hours. The Ukrainian Minister of Culture, Oleksandr Tkachenko, wrote on the social media platform Telegram, "In Emily in Paris, we have a caricature image of a Ukrainian woman that is unacceptable. It is also insulting." He also wrote a letter to Netflix complaining about the depiction of Petra. According to Tkachenko, Netflix sent a response saying that they had heard the dissatisfaction of Ukrainian viewers, and that Petra would be shown in a different context for the third season.

Bribery allegations at the Golden Globe Awards 
The show received two nominations at the Golden Globe Awards, but prior to the ceremony, it was reported that 30 members of the voting body had been flown to Paris, where they spent two nights at The Peninsula Paris and were treated to a private lunch at the Musée des Arts Forains, with the bill reportedly paid by the show's developer, Paramount Network. This led some critics to question the impartiality of the voting body, as Emily in Paris was considered to be a critical failure, and its nomination was a surprise. In contrast, critically acclaimed shows, notably I May Destroy You, were not nominated.

Accolades

See also
 French television

Notes

References

External links
 
 

2020 American television series debuts
2020s American comedy-drama television series
2020s American romantic comedy television series
2020s American workplace comedy television series
2020s American workplace drama television series
English-language Netflix original programming
French-language Netflix original programming
Television series created by Darren Star
Television series about social media
Television shows filmed in France
Television shows filmed in Illinois
Television shows set in Paris